Fantastic Journey to OZ is a 2017 Russian computer-animated film based on the novel Urfin Jus and his Wooden Soldiers  by Alexander Volkov.

The film was directed by Vladimir Toropchin, Fyodor Dmitriev and Darina Schmidt. It is the first animated film from Melnitsa Animation Studio made using computer animation.

The premiere took place on April 20, 2017.

Plot
The envious and power-hungry Urfin Jus wants to become the ruler of Magic Land. He brings the wooden soldiers to life with a magic powder and goes with them to conquer the Emerald City. He is already preparing to celebrate the victory, but in the Magic Land there is also a little girl named Ellie. She wants to go home, but first she needs to help her friends Scarecrow, the Tin Woodman and the Cowardly Lion to defeat Urfin Jus and his army.

Cast

Russian Dub
Konstantin Khabensky – Urfin Jus
 Ekaterina Gorokhovskaya – Ellie
Sergey Shnurov – General Lan Pirot
Dmitri Dyuzhev – Topotun the Bear
 Andrey Lyovin – Totoshka
 Yuliya Rudina – Eot Ling the Clown
 Sergey Dyachkov – Scarecrow
 Valery Solovyov – Tin Woodman
Valery Kukhareshin – The Cowardly Lion
 Aleksandr Boyarsky – Ogre
Dmitry Bykovsky-Romashov – Sabretooth Tiger
Mikhail Chernyak – crow Kaggi-Karr
Oleg Kulikovich – Ruf Bilan

English Dub
Marc Thompson – Urfin Jus
Alyson Leigh Rosenfeld - Ellie (as Dorothy)
Tyler Bunch – General Lan Pirot, Ogre (credited as H.D. Quinn)
Erica Schroeder - Totoshka, Grandma
Haven Paschall - Eot Ling the Clown
Billy Bob Thompson – Scarecrow
Tom Wayland – Tin Woodman
Mike Pollock – The Cowardly Lion, Ruf Bilan
Kate Bristol - Crown

Accolade

Sequels
Fantastic Return to Oz: a 2019 Russian computer animated film.

References

External links

Official website

Melnitsa Animation Studio animated films
Animated films based on The Wizard of Oz
Russian 3D films
2017 3D films
Russian children's films
Russian animated fantasy films
2017 computer-animated films
Russian animated feature films
Animated adventure films
Animated comedy films
2010s adventure comedy films
2010s fantasy comedy films
Russian comedy films
Russian adventure films
2017 comedy films
2010s Russian-language films